Rudström is a surname. Notable people with the surname include:

 Björn Rudström (born 1954), Swedish curler
 Håkan Rudström (born 1957), Swedish curler and coach
 Karin Rudström (born 1988), Swedish curler